Laughin' & Cryin' with the Reverend Horton Heat is The Reverend Horton Heat's tenth studio album.

Track listing
All songs written by Jim Heath except as noted.
 "Drinkin' and Smokin' Cigarettes" – 4:04
 "Ain't No Saguaro in Texas" – 3:41
 "Death Metal Guys" (Heath, Simmons, Wallace) – 3:20
 "River Ran Dry" – 2:40
 "Please Don't Take the Baby to the Liquor Store" (Wallace, Heath) – 2:53
 "Aw, the Humanity" – 4:40
 "Rural Point of View" – 3:30
 "Oh God! Doesn't Work in Vegas" – 4:28
 "Spacewalk" – 2:45
 "Beer Holder" – 3:48
 "Crazy Ex-Boyfriend" – 3:19
 "There's a Little Bit of Everything in Texas" (Ernest Tubb) – 2:24
 "Just Let Me Hold My Paycheck" – 4:26
 "Oh By Jingo!" (Lew Brown, Albert Von Tilzer) – 2:08

Personnel
Band members
Jim "Reverend Horton" Heath- lead vocal, guitar, pedal steel guitar
Jimbo Wallace - upright bass
Paul Simmons - drums, background vocals

Additional musicians
Tim Alexander - piano, accordion, bajo sexto, producer

Production
Paul Osborn - engineer
Dave McNair - mastering
Vince Ruarus - cover art illustration
Michael Triplett - design
Drew Reynolds - photography

References

2009 albums
The Reverend Horton Heat albums
Yep Roc Records albums